Anzhela Atroshchenko-Kinet (born ,  on ) is a former Turkish athlete of Belarusian descent. She competed in the pentathlon and heptathlon category.

Biography

Atroshchenko started her career in athletics with pentathlon at the age of 14 years. She represented the Unified Team at the 1992 Summer Olympics in Barcelona, Spain and finished 12th.

In 1999, Atroshchenko signed a contract with the Istanbul club of Enka SK and became a Turkish citizen. Then she transferred to her current Club Fenerbahçe Athletics. Since then, Atroshchenko has represented Turkey at various competitions.

In 2001, Atroshchenko finished 4th at the European Championships in Athletics.

Atroshchenko competed in the 2004 Summer Olympics in Athens, Greece in the women's heptathlon category, but withdrew after four events because of injury.

In 2005, Atroshchenko took part in the 2005 Mediterranean Games in Almería, Spain, Europe, where she won the bronze medal in heptathlon with 5,870 points.

Atroshchenko regularly commutes between her home in Turkey and Russia, where she trains. She speaks Belarusian, Russian, and Turkish.

References

External links

1970 births
Living people
Enkaspor athletes
Fenerbahçe athletes
Belarusian heptathletes
Naturalized citizens of Turkey
Turkish people of Belarusian descent
Athletes (track and field) at the 1992 Summer Olympics
Athletes (track and field) at the 1996 Summer Olympics
Athletes (track and field) at the 2004 Summer Olympics
Olympic athletes of the Unified Team
Olympic athletes of Belarus
Olympic athletes of Turkey
Turkish female heptathletes
Mediterranean Games gold medalists for Turkey
Mediterranean Games bronze medalists for Turkey
Athletes (track and field) at the 2001 Mediterranean Games
Athletes (track and field) at the 2005 Mediterranean Games
Mediterranean Games medalists in athletics
Turkish female modern pentathletes